This is a list of medical textbooks, manuscripts, and reference works.

Pre-modern texts

Ancient Egypt 

 Ramesseum medical papyri (c. 1800 BCE)
 Kahun Gynaecological Papyrus (c. 1800 BCE)
 London Medical Papyrus (c. 1600 BCE)
 Ebers Papyrus (c. 1550 BCE)
 Edwin Smith Papyrus (c. 1500 BCE) -  Earliest mention of the brain; the pulse; the role of the heart in circulating blood, but not complete circulation. It is the world's oldest surgical textbook, containing descriptions of the zygomatic bone, dura mater, cerebrospinal fluid, and nasal cavity.
 Brugsch Papyrus (c. 1200 BCE)

Ancient Greece 

 Hippocratic Corpus (c. 400 BCE to 200 CE) - Contains many important medical treatises including the Hippocratic Oath. Compared with the Egyptian papyri, the Hippocratic writings exhibit an improved understanding of brain structure and function. It correctly attributed the primary control of the body's function to the brain.
 Galenic corpus (c. 200 BCE)
 De Materia Medica (Dioscorides) (c. 50 CE)
 Medical Compendium in Seven Books (c. 600 CE)

Ancient China 
 Huangdi Neijing (c. 300 BCE) -  Most authoritative Chinese source on medical matters for over two millennia. It contributed to the Chinese understanding of anatomy, and it continues to be used as an influential reference work for practitioners of traditional Chinese medicine. The book contains many guidelines and recommendations for the prevention of chronic diseases and micronutrient deficiencies such as beriberi, xerophthalmia, and goitre.
 Wushi'er Bingfang (c. 200 BCE)
 Shennong Ben Cao Jing (c. 200 CE)
 Shanghan Lun (c. 220 CE)
 Liu Juanzi Guiyi Fang (C. 499 CE)
 Compendium of Materia Medica (c. 1578 CE)

Ancient India 
 Kashyapa Samhita (6th century BCE)
 Sushruta Samhita (c. 300 BCE) - Early description of cataract surgery. The Sushruta Samhita emphasizes the importance of anatomical structure and function, and it contains the earliest written description of the pedicled flaps. It was translated into Arabic during the latter part of the 8th century.
 Bower Manuscript (c. 470-550 CE)
 Charaka Samhita (c. 300-500 CE) - One of the fundamental texts of Ayurveda medicine, it was translated into Chinese, Arabic, and Tibetan languages.

Islamic Golden Age 

 Kitab al-Taṣrif (c. 1000) -  Surgical encyclopedia.
 Book of Optics (c. 1000) - Exerted great influence on Western science. It was translated into Latin and it was used until the early 17th century. The German physician Hermann von Helmholtz reproduced several theories of visual perception that were found in the first Book of Optics, which he cited and copied from.
 The Canon of Medicine (c. 1000) - Described by Sir William Osler as a "medical bible" and "the most famous medical textbook ever written". The Canon of Medicine introduced the concept of a syndrome as an aid to diagnosis, and it laid out an essential framework for a clinical trial. It was translated into Latin by Gerard de Sabloneta and it was used extensively in European medical schools. It also became the most authoritative text on anatomy until the 16th century.
 Commentary on Anatomy in Avicenna's Canon (c. 1200): First description of the pulmonary circulation system, and the first description of the presence and function of coronary circulation.

Medieval Europe 

Compendium Medicinæ ("Compendium of Medicine") (c. 1230-1250)
 Thesaurus Pauperum ("Treasury of The Poor") (c. 1270)
 Rosa Anglica ("The English Rose") (1304-1317)
 La Chirurgie ("Surgery") (1306-1320)
 Stockholm, Royal Library, manuscript X. 90 (early fifteenth-century). A significant and compendious collection of Middle English medical recipes, charms, and treatises.

Modern textbooks

Anatomy 

Gray's Anatomy
 Gray's Anatomy for Students
Netter - Atlas of Human Anatomy
Clinically Oriented Anatomy
Snell's Clinical Anatomy by Regions

Neuroanatomy 
 Snell's Clinical Neuroanatomy
 Neuroanatomy - Text and Atlas
 Fitzgerald's Clinical Neuroanatomy and Neuroscience

Anaesthesiology 
 Practical Management of Pain
 Textbook of Pain -  Most comprehensive scientific reference text on pain. The textbook's founding editors were Patrick David Wall and Ronald Melzack, who jointly introduced the gate control theory into the field of pain research.

Cardiology 
 Braunwald's Heart Disease: A Textbook of Cardiovascular Medicine
 Fuster and Hurst's the Heart

Clinical Examination 

 Talley and O'Connor's Clinical Examination 
 Macleod's Clinical Examination 
 Bates' Guide To Physical Examination and History Taking

Dermatology 
 Rook's Textbook of Dermatology
 Fitzpatrick's Dermatology

Embryology 
 Langman's Medical Embryology
 The Developing Human: Clinically Oriented Embryology

Emergency Medicine 
 Tintinalli's Emergency Medicine: A Comprehensive Study Guide
 Rosen's Emergency Medicine: Concepts and Clinical Practice

Histology 
 Netter's Essential Histology
 Histology - A Text and Atlas With Correlated Cell and Molecular Biology
 Junqueira's Basic Histology, Text and Atlas

Internal Medicine 
 Harrison's Principles of Internal Medicine
 The Principles and Practice of Medicine
 Davidson's Principles and Practice of Medicine
 Current Medical Diagnosis and Treatment
The Oxford Textbook of Medicine
Goldman-Cecil Medicine
 Kumar and Clark's Clinical Medicine

Neurology 
 Adams and Victor's Principles of Neurology

Neuroscience 
 Principles of Neural Science

Obstetrics and Gynecology 
 Williams Obstetrics
 Williams Gynecology
 Berek & Novak's Gynecology
 Te Linde's Operative Gynecology
 Hacker & Moore's Essentials of Obstetrics and Gynecology

Oncology 
 Abeloff's Clinical Oncology
 Skin Cancer: Recognition and Management

Pediatrics 

 Nelson Textbook of Pediatrics

Physiology 
 Guyton's Textbook of Medical Physiology
Ganong's Review of Medical Physiology
Human Physiology: From Cells to Systems

Surgery 
 Schwartz's Principles of Surgery
 Sabiston Textbook of Surgery - The Biological Basis of Modern Surgical Practice
Bailey & Love's Short Practice of Surgery

Urology 
 Campbell-Walsh-Wein Urology

National and international publications 
 Diagnostic and Statistical Manual of Mental Disorders (DSM) - Official publication of the  American Psychiatric Association
 International Classification of Diseases (ICD) - Official publication of the World Health Organization

Handbooks 
 Oxford Handbook of Clinical Medicine
Step up to medicine
Harrisons Manual of Medicine

Dictionaries and encyclopedias 
 Miller-Keane Encyclopedia & Dictionary of Medicine, Nursing, and Allied Health
 Taber's Cyclopedic Medical Dictionary
 The Modern Home Physician

Reference guides 
 Current Medical Diagnosis and Treatment
 Washington Manual of Medical Therapeutics
 The Merck Manuals
 The Oxford Textbook of Medicine
 The Principles and Practice of Medicine

See also 
 List of medical journals

References 

Lists of books
Medical manuals
Textbooks
Medical textbooks